James Lynch (fitz Ambrose) (fl.1574–1591) was Mayor of Galway from 1590 to 1591.

Lynch was a member of The Tribes of Galway. He appears to have been the first merchant of Galway with an ownership claim to the Aran Islands, becoming involved with a dispute concerning the town's Corporation's customs to the then owners, the Clan Tiege of Aran, and subsequent ownership issues with Murrough na dTuadh Ó Flaithbheartaigh, Lord of Iar Connacht (fl. 1569–1593). Murrough mac Toirdelbach Ó Briain, Chief of the Name, (fl. 1575–1588) made an agreement with Lynch in June that if the Clan Teige should become extinct, he "should be their sole heir and possess Aron and their whole islands."

They eventually passed into the ownership of his son, Sir Henry Lynch.

Lynch was elected Mayor of Galway in summer of 1590. In that year, a belfry was erected in the town's St. Nicholas' Collegiate Church, his name been inscribed upon one of the bells. Just before he left office on 23 August 1591, he wrote a letter to Sir Richard Bingham, then Governor of Connacht, complaining that because the use of French ships had been banned by the government, the wealth of the town was in severe decline.

Note

His appellation, fitz Ambrose, indicated his father, and was not a surname.

References
 History of Galway, James Hardiman, Galway, 1820
 Old Galway, Maureen Donovan O'Sullivan, 1942
 Stones of Aran:Pilgrimage, pp. 241–48, 262, Tim Robinson, 1987
 An Account of the town of Galway, Paul Walsh, Journal of the Galway Archaeological and Historical Society, 1992
 Stones of Aran:Labyrinth, p. 57, 187, 347, 363, Tim Robinson, 1995
 Henry, William (2002). Role of Honour: The Mayors of Galway City 1485-2001. Galway: Galway City Council.  

Mayors of Galway
16th-century Irish politicians
Year of birth missing
Year of death missing